Williams Acres is an unincorporated community and census-designated place (CDP) in McKinley County, New Mexico, United States. It was first listed as a CDP prior to the 2020 census.

The CDP is in the western part of the county, in the valley of the Puerco River, a west-flowing tributary of the Little Colorado. The community is bordered to the south by Interstate 40 and to the north by New Mexico State Road 118 (Historic Route 66).

Demographics

Education
It is in Gallup-McKinley County Public Schools.

Zoned schools are: Tobe Turpen Elementary School, Chief Manualito Middle School, and Gallup High School.

References 

Census-designated places in McKinley County, New Mexico
Census-designated places in New Mexico